Mike Navarre (born June 9, 1956) is an American businessman and politician who formerly served as mayor of Alaska's Kenai Peninsula Borough and as a member of the Alaska House of Representatives.

Biography
Mike Navarre was born on June 9, 1956 in Lansing, Michigan, one of eleven children (seven sons and four daughters) of George A. Navarre (1923–2009) and his wife Rose (née Doogan).  The family moved to Kenai, Alaska when he was an infant, where they established themselves in the business community.  At first, the family opened up a grocery store, then branched out into an auto service business and fast food franchising, both of which currently operate locations across Alaska.  He dropped out of college in the 1970s and moved to Fairbanks, Alaska, moving back to Kenai in 1978. Navarre later returned to college and graduated with a Bachelor of Arts in Government from Eastern Washington University in 1983.

Navarre was first elected to the state House as a Democrat in 1984, and served until 1996, representing District 5 (holding Seat A) from 1985–93 and District 9 from 1993–96. He chaired the House Finance Committee for several years and was Majority Leader from 1989 until 1991. In 1996, Navarre successfully ran for mayor of Kenai Peninsula Borough, before being defeated by Dale Bagley in 1999. He once again ran in 2011, and was reelected in 2014.  During his first term as mayor, he served as president of the Alaska Conference of Mayors.

In October 2017, while the election to replace Navarre had gone to a runoff, he was appointed by Bill Walker, then-governor of Alaska, to head the Alaska Department of Commerce, Community and Economic Development.  The appointment came about when the department's commissioner Chris Hladick was appointed by Scott Pruitt, the administrator of the Environmental Protection Agency, to become the agency's Region 10 director.  His successor Charlie Pierce took office as mayor on November 5;  Navarre spent several days coordinating the transition with Pierce before starting his new job.

Navarre serves on the Kenai Chamber of Commerce, North Peninsula Chamber of Commerce, and Peninsula Petroleum Club. He is also a member of the Municipal Advisory Gas Project Review Board, as well as the board of the Rasmuson Foundation.

Electoral history

References

1956 births
20th-century American politicians
21st-century American politicians
Eastern Washington University alumni
Living people
Mayors of places in Alaska
Democratic Party members of the Alaska House of Representatives
People from Kenai, Alaska
Politicians from Fairbanks, Alaska
Politicians from Lansing, Michigan
State cabinet secretaries of Alaska